Peter Porter may refer to:

 Peter Buell Porter (1773–1844), U.S. political figure and soldier
 Peter A. Porter (colonel) (1827–1864), his son, Union Army colonel
 Peter A. Porter (1853–1925), U.S. political figure and grandson of Peter Buell Porter
 Peter Porter (poet) (1929–2010), Australian-born British poet
 Peter B. Porter Jr. (1806–1871), American lawyer and politician, nephew of Peter Buell Porter